The Devil's Saddle Legion is a 1937 American Western film directed by Bobby Connolly and written by Ed Earl Repp. The film stars Dick Foran, Anne Nagel, Willard Parker, Gordon Hart, Ernie Stanton, Max Hoffman Jr. and Jeff York. The film was released by Warner Bros. on August 14, 1937.

Plot
A rancher finds out that a dam is planned which will cover some of his lands and divert a river, taking some territory from Texas. He successfully fights the plan.

Cast  
 Dick Foran as Tal Holladay 
 Anne Nagel as Karan Ordley
 Willard Parker as Hub Ordley
 Gordon Hart as John Ordley
 Ernie Stanton as Reggie
 Max Hoffman Jr. as Butch
 Jeff York as Chris Madden 
 Glenn Strange as Pewee 
 Carlyle Moore Jr. as Chip Carter
 John 'Skins' Miller as Spooks Wilkins
 Frank Orth as Judge Barko
 Jack Mower as Slats Dawson
 Milton Kibbee as Spane 
 George Chesebro as Red Frayne
 Charles Le Moyne as Caliope
 Ray Bennett as Sheriff Duke Gorman

References

External links 
 
 }
 
 

1937 films
American Western (genre) films
1937 Western (genre) films
Warner Bros. films
American black-and-white films
Films directed by Bobby Connolly
1930s English-language films
1930s American films